Mavai may refer to:
Mavai-ye Olya
Mavai-ye Sofla (disambiguation)
Mavai-ye Vasat